Dunkerque Seaways (previously Maersk Dunkerque) is a ro-pax ferry operated by DFDS Seaways on their cross-channel route between Dover, United Kingdom and Dunkirk, France. She was delivered to Norfolkline in 2005 as Maersk Dunkerque.

Career
Norfolkline, a subsidiary of the Danish shipping company Maersk, placed an order with Samsung Heavy Industries for three ro-pax ferries to replace older ships on the cross-channel route between Dover and Dunkirk. Maersk Dunkerque was the first of her class. She was built at the Samsung Heavy Industries yard in Geoje, South Korea. She was delivered in September 2005 and made her maiden voyage on 9 November 2005. In July 2010, following the acquisition of Norfolkline by DFDS Seaways, the ship was renamed Dunkerque Seaways and rebranded in DFDS Seaways livery.

Layout and facilities
'Dunkerque Seaways has three vehicle decks; a lower deck for freight vehicles only, a deck for mixed traffic and an upper deck for passenger cars. Her passenger facilities are arranged over two decks and include two restaurants, a bar,  shop, children's play area, games arcade and Bureau de Change. There are seven lifts. The crew accommodation includes cabins, a dayroom, offices, laundry, stores, gymnasium and mess facilities for officers and crew.

A prominent feature on board are the large panoramic windows at the front and the side with their uninterrupted sea views.

Sister ships
Dunkerque Seaways has two sister ships operating on the same service: Delft Seaways and ''Dover Seaways.

References

Gallery

External links

M/F Maersk Dunkerque
DFDS Seaways

Ferries of the United Kingdom
2004 ships
Ships built by Samsung Heavy Industries
DFDS